Ferocactus schwarzii is a species of Ferocactus from Mexico.

Distribution
Ferocactus schwarzii is commonly found in Sinaloa, Mexico and occurs between elevations between 30 and 200 meters. The IUCN Red List classifies this species as "Data Deficient" (DD).

References

External links
 
 

schwarzii
Flora of Mexico
Plants described in 1955